New Westminster—Coquitlam was a federal electoral district in British Columbia, Canada, that was represented in the House of Commons of Canada from 1979 to 1988, and from 2004 to 2015.

Demographics
According to the Canada 2006 Census

Ethnic groups: 69.7% White, 10.4% Chinese, 3.9% South Asian, 3.3% Korean, 3.1% Filipino, 2.3% Aboriginal, 1.8% West Asian, 1.3% Black, 1.2% Latin American, 1.0% Japanese 
Languages: 66.3% English, 1.6% French, 31.9% Other 
Religion: (2001) No religion 34.1%, Protestant 29.1%, 22.0% Catholic, Christian Orthodox 2.0%, Other Christian 5.7%, Muslim 2.5%, Buddhist 1.7%
Average income: $28,241

The riding has the highest percentage in Canada of people who work outside the municipality, but within the same census division.

Geography
The district consisted of the eastern part of New Westminster, the southwestern part of Coquitlam and the southern part of Port Moody.

The NDP found much of its support in New Westminster, Port Moody and in the Maillardville part of Coquitlam. The Conservatives found most of their support in the more suburban parts of Coquitlam.

History
This electoral district was first created in 1976 from New Westminster and Fraser Valley West ridings.

It was abolished in 1987 when it was redistributed between New Westminster—Burnaby and Port Moody—Coquitlam ridings.

It was re-created in 2003 from New Westminster—Coquitlam—Burnaby and Port Moody—Coquitlam—Port Coquitlam ridings.

It is currently the longest-held riding by non-government parties as both it and its predecessor ridings New Westminster—Coquitlam—Burnaby,  New Westminster—Burnaby  and New Westminster  have not been represented by a member of the government side since 1968.

The 2012 electoral redistribution dissolved this riding into the ridings of Port Moody—Coquitlam and New Westminster—Burnaby for the 2015 election.

Members of Parliament

This riding has elected the following Members of Parliament:

Election results

New Westminster—Coquitlam, 2004–2015

New Westminster—Coquitlam, 1979–1988

See also
 List of Canadian federal electoral districts
 Past Canadian electoral districts

References

 Library of Parliament Riding Profile (1976-1987)
 Library of Parliament Riding Profile
 Expenditures - 2004
 Expenditures - 2000

Notes

External links
 Website of the Parliament of Canada
 Map of New Westminster—Coquitlam riding archived by Elections Canada

Former federal electoral districts of British Columbia
Federal electoral districts in Greater Vancouver and the Fraser Valley
Politics of Coquitlam
Port Moody
New Westminster